Sainte-Suzanne is a former commune in the Mayenne department in north-western France. On 1 January 2016, it was merged into the new commune of Sainte-Suzanne-et-Chammes.
French composer Jean Déré died in Sainte-Suzanne on 6 December 1970.

See also
Communes of the Mayenne department

References

Saintesuzanne